Harold Fox (birth unknown) is a former professional rugby league footballer who played in the 1940s and 1950s. He played at club level for Castleford (Heritage № 284).

References

External links
Search for "Fox" at rugbyleagueproject.org
Harold Fox Memory Box Search at archive.castigersheritage.com

Living people
Castleford Tigers players
English rugby league players
Place of birth missing (living people)
Year of birth missing (living people)